Wilker Pereira dos Santos, known simply as Wilker, (born 16 June 1987) is a Brazilian footballer who plays as a forward for Tërbuni Pukë in the Albanian Superliga.

Career
Wilker began his career with Treviso. During the 2005–06 season, at the age of 18, he made his Serie A debut, coming on as a substitute in a 2–1 home win over Udinese on 14 May 2006.

References

External links
Wilker Profile at gazzetta.it
Profile

1987 births
Living people
Brazilian footballers
Brazilian expatriate footballers
Treviso F.B.C. 1993 players
S.S. Virtus Lanciano 1924 players
Genoa C.F.C. players
FC Lokomotiv 1929 Sofia players
Serie A players
Serie B players
First Professional Football League (Bulgaria) players
Expatriate footballers in Italy
Expatriate footballers in Bulgaria
Expatriate footballers in Albania
Association football forwards
Sportspeople from Bahia